Dinocephalia is a genus of beetles in the family Buprestidae, containing the following species:

 Dinocephalia browni (Carter, 1933)
 Dinocephalia burnsi Bellamy, 1988
 Dinocephalia carteri (Obenberger, 1943)
 Dinocephalia cyaneipennis (Blackburn, 1893)
 Dinocephalia leucogaster Bellamy, 1988
 Dinocephalia thoracica (Kerremans, 1900)
 Dinocephalia transsecta (Carter, 1921)

References

Buprestidae genera